The Providence Friars men's soccer program represents the Providence College in all NCAA Division I men's college soccer competitions. Founded in 1968, the Friars compete in the Big East Conference. The Friars are coached by Craig Stewart, a former semi-professional player and head coach for the Franklin Pierce Ravens men's soccer program. Providence plays their home matches at Chapey Field at Anderson Stadium.

Individual honors

First Team All-Americans 
Providence has fielded three first-team All-Americans.

Second Team All-Americans 
Providence has fielded one second-team All-American.

Third Team All-Americans 
Providence has fielded three third-team All-Americans.

Coaching history 
Updated through the end of the 2017 season.

Postseason records

NCAA Tournament 

Providence have appeared in nine NCAA Tournaments. Their first appearance came in 1983. Their most recent came in 2016.

References

External links 
 

 
1968 establishments in Rhode Island